Golden Lake is a lake in Ontario, Canada.

Golden Lake or Golden Lakes may also refer to:

Golden Lake (Minnesota), a lake in Anoka County
Golden Lake (Nova Scotia), a lake of Halifax Regional Municipality
Golden Lakes, Florida, a former town
Golden Lakes (Washington), in Mount Rainier National Park
The Golden Lake, an 1890 novel by Carlton Dawe

See also
Algonquins of Pikwàkanagàn First Nation, formerly called Golden Lake First Nation